Cyphomandra was a formerly accepted genus in the  plant family Solanaceae (the nightshades and relative). It used to contain about 35 species native to the Americas from Mexico southwards to Northern Argentina.

Recent authors have treated Cyphomandra as a clade within the genus Solanum rather than as a separate genus, uniting the members of the old genus with some other Solanum. This lineage is one among a group related to part of the traditional subgenus Leptostemonum. Thus, if it is preferred to retain the taxon, Cyphomandra is probably best considered a section in Solanum subgenus Leptostemonum.

Most grow as shrubs or small trees  2 or 3 metres in height. The best known species is the widely cultivated Tamarillo or tree tomato, but a number of the others are also cultivated as garden plants because of their attractive flowers or fruits. Several other species (e.g. S. cajanumense, S. circinatum, S. sibundoyense) also have fruits that are edible when ripe, and yet others are used as dyestuffs or in folk medicine where they are native.

Species
Species contained in the Cyphomandra clade, with their former specific epithets cited if they have significantly changed when moving to Solanum, are:
 Solanum allophyllum (Miers) Standl.
 Solanum amotapense Svenson (= Cyphomandra villosa Steyerm.)
 Solanum betaceum – Tamarillo (= Cyphomandra crassicaulis(?), C. crassifolia (Ortega) J.F.Macbr., C. crassifolia (Ortega) Kuntze, C. procera Wawra)
 Solanum cacosmum Bohs (Cyphomandra foetida Bohs)
 Solanum cajanumense (= Cyphomandra casana A.Child)
 Solanum calidum Bohs (= Cyphomandra pilosa Bohs)
 Solanum circinatum Bohs (= Cyphomandra artocarpophylla H.J.P.Winkl., C. costaricencis Donn.Sm., C. dendroidea Pittier, C. dolichorhachis Bitter, C. hartwegii (Miers) Walp., C. hartwegii ssp. ramosa Bohs, C. heterophylla Donn.Sm., C. holtonii Hochr., C. kalbreyeri Bitter, C. mollicella Standl., C. naranjilla Pittier, C. splendens Dunal in DC.)
 Solanum confusum C.V.Morton (= Cyphomandra adelpha (C.V.Morton) A.Child)
 Solanum corymbiflorum (Sendtn.) Bohs (= Cyphomandra kleinii L.B.Sm. & Downs, C.  macrophylla L.B.Sm. & Downs, C. mortoniana L.B.Sm. & Down, C. patrum L.B.Sm. & Downs)
 Solanum cylindricum Vell. (= Cyphomandra elliptica (Vell.) Sendtn. in Mart., C. subhastata (L.B.Sm. & Downs) A.Child)
 Solanum diploconos (Mart.) Bohs (= Cyphomandra floribunda (Miers) Dunal in DC., C. fragrans (Hook.) Sendtn. in Mart., C. piperoides Dunal in DC.)
 Solanum diversifolium Dunal (= Cyphomandra campanulata Moritz ex Steyerm. & Huber, C. caracasana (Roem. & Schult.) Sendtn., C. caudata Standl., C. chlorantha Rusby, C. meridensis Steyerm. & Rojas)
 Solanum endopogon (Bitter) Bohs
 Solanum exiguum (= Cyphomandra benensis Britton)
 Solanum fallax (= Cyphomandra betacea var. velutina Dunal in DC., C. hypomalaca Bitter)
 Solanum fortunense (= Cyphomandra dolichocarpa Bitter)
 Solanum fusiforme L.B.Sm. & Downs
 Solanum glaucophyllum Desf.
 Solanum hibernum Bohs
 Solanum hutchisonii (J.F.Macbr.) Bohs
 Solanum latiflorum (= Cyphomandra calycina Sendtn., C. calycina var. rufescens Dunal in DC.)
 Solanum luridifuscescens Bitter (= Cyphomandra glaberrima Dusén, C. velutina Sendtn. in Mart.)
 Solanum luteoalbum
 Solanum mapiriense Bitter (= Cyphomandra phytolaccoides (Rusby) A.Child)
 Solanum maranguapense Bitter
 Solanum matadori Smith & Downs
 Solanum maternum Bohs
 Solanum melissarum (= Cyphomandra capsicoides (Miers) Walp., C. ciliata (Miers) Walp., C. divaricata (Mart.) Sendtn., C. divaricata var. flexipes Sendtn. in Mart., C. divaricata var. herbacea Sendtn. in Mart., C. laxiflora Dunal in DC., C. oxyphylla Dunal in DC.)
 Solanum morellifolium Bohs
 Solanum obliquum Ruiz & Pav. (= Cyphomandra brachypodia Sendtn., C. coriacea (Miers) Walp., C. obliqua (Ruiz & Pav.) Sendtn., C. ulei Bitter)
 Solanum occultum Bohs (= Cyphomandra stellata Bohs)
 Solanum ovum-fringillae
 Solanum oxyphyllum C.V.Morton (= Cyphomandra fragilis Bohs)
 Solanum paralum (= Cyphomandra heterophylla Taub.)
 Solanum pelagicum Bohs (= Cyphomandra cornigera Dunal in DC., C. maritima L.B.Sm. & Downs)
 Solanum pendulum Ruiz & Pav. (= Cyphomandra arborea H.J.P.Winkl., C. subcordata Rusby)
 Solanum pinetorum (= Cyphomandra angustifolia L.B.Sm. & Downs, C. hispida L.B.Sm. & Downs)
 Solanum premnifolium (Miers) Bohs
 Solanum proteanthum Bohs (= Cyphomandra oblongifolia Bohs)
 Solanum rojasianum (Standl. & Steyerm.) Bohs
 Solanum roseum (= Cyphomandra acuminata Rusby)
 Solanum sciadostylis (Sendtn.) Bohs (= Cyphomandra reitzii L.B.Sm. & Downs)
 Solanum sibundoyense
 Solanum stuckertii Bitter
 Solanum sycocarpum (= Cyphomandra lobata Sendtn. in Mart.)
 Solanum tegore Aubl. (= Cyphomandra tejore Sendtn. ex Walp.)
 Solanum tenuisetosum (Bitter) Bohs
 Solanum tobagense (= Cyphomandra bolivarensis Steyerm.)
 Solanum unilobum (Rusby) Bohs

Formerly placed here
Species formerly in the genus Cyphomandra which are not members of the Cyphomandra clade are:
 Solanum abutiloides (Griseb.) Bitter & Lillo

Footnotes

References
  (1988): Four new species of Cyphomandra (Solanaceae) from South America. Systematic Botany 13(2): 265-275. First page image
  (1989): Ethnobotany of the genus Cyphomandra (Solanaceae). Economic Botany 43(2): 143-163 [English with Spanish abstract].  (HTML abstract and first page image)
  (1994): Cyphomandra (Solanaceae). Flora Neotropica 63: 1-175.
  (1995): Transfer of Cyphomandra (Solanaceae) and Its Species to Solanum. Taxon 44(4): 583-587. First page image
  [2008]: Phylogeny. Retrieved 2008-OCT-01.

Solanum
Historically recognized angiosperm genera